Karsanbhai Odedara is an Indian politician and member of the Bharatiya Janata Party. Karsanbhai is a member of the Gujarat Legislative Assembly in 2007 from the Kutiyana constituency assembly constituency in Porbandar District.

References 

People from Porbandar
Gujarat MLAs 2007–2012
Living people
Bharatiya Janata Party politicians from Gujarat
Year of birth missing (living people)
Gujarat MLAs 2002–2007